Copper Mountain College (CMC) is a public community college in Joshua Tree, California.  It was accredited in 2001 as the 108th such institution in the state. CMC offers a total of 24 different certificates and degrees.

History 
CMC was originally an offshoot of the College of the Desert. Founded in 1966 for the purpose of providing education opportunities for the surrounding desert communities and families stationed at the 29 Palms Marine Corps Air Ground Combat Center, the college held its first courses in classrooms at the 29 Palms High School campus during the fall, 1967 semester. Fundraising for the construction of a stand-alone campus began in 1981, with its first phase completed in 1984. At that time State Senator James Brulte learned of Copper Mountain wanting to achieve community college status he introduced the Copper Mountain Community College District legislation. The Morongo Basin residents endorsed their new college in a 90 percent vote in November 1999. In June 2001, the Accrediting Commission for Community and Junior Colleges of the Western Association of Schools and Colleges granted CMC full accreditation status.

Athletics 

The athletics program launched in 2017 with only basketball. Copper Mountain College competes in Men's and Women's basketball and Women's volleyball in the Orange Empire Conference. The team nickname is the Fighting Cacti. In 2019 Copper Mountain College joined the newly formed Inland Empire Athletic Conference.

Women's basketball 
In the 2017-2018 inaugural season, led by coach Hosie Ward they finished 0-23 overall. The current head coach for women's basketball is Ken Simonds, assisted by Johnette Brown. In the 2018–2019 season, led by coach Ken Simonds they finished 11-14 overall, with 6–8 in conference.

Men's basketball 
In the 2017-2018 inaugural season, they finished 22-1 overall. In the 2018–2019 season, led by Britain Kelley and Walter Parham, they finished 15-13 overall.

Student Government
The students of Copper Mountain College have established a student body association named Associated Students of Copper Mountain College (ASCMC). The association is required by law to "encourage students to participate in the governance of the college".

ASCMC is a voting member of a statewide community college student organization named Student Senate for California Community Colleges. The statewide Student Senate is authorized by law "to advocate before the Legislature and other state and local governmental entities".

Bud and Betty's Place for Veterans 
In November 2015, CMC opened Bud and Betty's Place for Veterans as a center for Students that have served in the armed forces. The center was opened as an extension to the Christine Proudfoot activity center that opened that same year. The center has been named after Retired Col. Bud Garrett and his wife Betty. Col Garrett donated a large sum of money to the center in his wife's honor.

See also
 California Community Colleges system

References

External links
 Official website

California Community Colleges
Schools accredited by the Western Association of Schools and Colleges
Educational institutions established in 1966
1966 establishments in California